Robert Banks Jenkinson, 2nd Earl of Liverpool,  (7 June 1770 – 4 December 1828) was a British Tory statesman who served as Prime Minister of the United Kingdom from 1812 to 1827. He held many important cabinet offices such as Foreign Secretary, Home Secretary and Secretary of State for War and the Colonies. He was also a member of the House of Lords and served as leader.

As prime minister, Liverpool called for repressive measures at domestic level to maintain order after the Peterloo Massacre of 1819. He dealt smoothly with the Prince Regent when King George III was incapacitated. He also steered the country through the period of radicalism and unrest that followed the Napoleonic Wars. He favoured commercial and manufacturing interests as well as the landed interest. He sought a compromise of the heated issue of Catholic emancipation. The revival of the economy strengthened his political position. By the 1820s he was the leader of a reform faction of "Liberal Tories" who lowered the tariff, abolished the death penalty for many offences, and reformed the criminal law. By the time of his death, however, the Tory party, which had dominated the House of Commons for over 40 years, was ripping itself apart.

Derry says he was: 

Important events during his tenure as prime minister included the War of 1812 with the United States, the Sixth and Seventh Coalitions against the French Empire, the conclusion of the Napoleonic Wars at the Congress of Vienna, the Corn Laws, the Peterloo Massacre, the Trinitarian Act 1812 and the emerging issue of Catholic emancipation.  Scholars rank him highly among all British prime ministers, but he was also called "the Arch-mediocrity" by a later Conservative prime minister, the Earl of Beaconsfield (Benjamin Disraeli).

Early life
Jenkinson was baptised on 29 June 1770 at St. Margaret's, Westminster, the son of George III's close adviser Charles Jenkinson, later the first Earl of Liverpool, and his first wife, Amelia Watts. Jenkinson's 19-year-old mother, who was the daughter of a senior East India Company official, William Watts, and of his wife Begum Johnson, died from the effects of childbirth one month after his birth. Through his mother's grandmother, Isabella Beizor, Jenkinson was descended from Portuguese settlers in India; he may also have been one-sixteenth Indian in ancestry.

Jenkinson was educated at Charterhouse School and matriculated at Christ Church, Oxford, in 1787. In the summer of 1789, Jenkinson spent four months in Paris to perfect his French and enlarge his social experience. He returned to Oxford for three months to complete his terms of residence, and in May 1790 was created Master of Arts.

Early career (1790–1812)

Member of Parliament 
He won election to the House of Commons in 1790 for Rye, a seat he would hold until 1803; at the time, however, he was below the age of assent to Parliament, so he refrained from taking his seat and spent the following winter and early spring in an extended tour of the continent. This tour took in the Netherlands and Italy; at its conclusion he was old enough to take his seat in Parliament. It is not clear exactly when he entered the Commons, but as his twenty-first birthday was not reached until almost the end of the 1791 session, it is possible that he waited until the following year.

House of Commons
With the help of his father's influence and his political talent, he rose relatively fast in the Tory government. In February 1792, he gave the reply to Samuel Whitbread's critical motion on the government's Russian policy. He delivered several other speeches during the session, and was a strong opposer of abolitionism and William Wilberforce. He served as a member of the Board of Control for India from 1793 to 1796.

In the defence movement that followed the outbreak of hostilities with France, Jenkinson, was one of the first of the ministers of the government to enlist in the militia. He became a colonel in the Cinque Ports Fencibles in 1794, and his military duties led to frequent absences from the Commons. His regiment was sent to Scotland in 1796, and he was quartered for a time in Dumfries.

In 1797, the then Lord Hawkesbury was the cavalry commander of the Cinque Ports Light Dragoons who ran amok following a protest against the Militia Act at Tranent in East Lothian; twelve civilians were killed. Author James Miller wrote in 1844 that "His lordship was blamed for remaining at Haddington, as his presence might have prevented the outrages of the soldiery."

His parliamentary attendance also suffered from his reaction when his father angrily opposed his projected marriage with Lady Louisa Hervey, daughter of the Earl of Bristol. After Pitt and the King had intervened on his behalf, the wedding finally took place at Wimbledon on 25 March 1795. In May 1796, when his father was created Earl of Liverpool, he took the courtesy title of Lord Hawkesbury and remained in the Commons. He became Baron Hawkesbury in his own right and was elevated to the House of Lords in November 1803, as recognition of his work as Foreign Secretary. He also served as Master of the Mint (1799–1801).

Cabinet

Foreign Secretary 
In Henry Addington's government, he entered the cabinet in 1801 as Secretary of State for Foreign Affairs, in which capacity he negotiated the Treaty of Amiens with France. Most of his time as Foreign Secretary was spent dealing with the nations of France and the United States. He continued to serve in the cabinet as Home Secretary in Pitt the Younger's second government. While Pitt was seriously ill, Liverpool was in charge of the cabinet and drew up the King's Speech for the official opening of Parliament. When William Pitt died in 1806, the King asked Liverpool to accept the post of Prime Minister, but he refused, as he believed he lacked a governing majority. He was then made leader of the Opposition during Lord Grenville's ministry (the only time that Liverpool did not hold government office between 1793 and after his retirement). In 1807, he resumed office as Home Secretary in the Duke of Portland's ministry.

War Secretary
Lord Liverpool (as he had now become by the death of his father in December 1808) accepted the position of Secretary of State for War and the Colonies in Spencer Perceval's government in 1809. Liverpool's first step on taking up his new post was to elicit from General Arthur Wellesley (the future Duke of Wellington) a strong enough statement of his ability to resist a French attack to persuade the cabinet to commit themselves to the maintenance of his small force in Portugal. In 1810 Liverpool was made a colonel of militia.

Prime Minister (1812–1827)

When Perceval was assassinated in May 1812, George, the Prince Regent, successively tried to appoint four men to succeed him, but they were unable to form ministries; Liverpool, the Prince Regent's fifth choice for the post, reluctantly accepted office on 8 June 1812. The cabinet proposed Liverpool as his successor with Lord Castlereagh as leader in the Commons but after an adverse vote in the Lower House, they subsequently both gave their resignations. The Prince Regent, however, found it impossible to form a different coalition and confirmed Liverpool as prime minister on 8 June. Liverpool's government contained some of the future great leaders of Britain, such as Lord Castlereagh, George Canning, the Duke of Wellington, Robert Peel and William Huskisson. Liverpool is considered a skilled politician, and held together the liberal and reactionary wings of the Tory party, which his successors, Canning, Goderich and Wellington, had great difficulty with.

War

Congress of Vienna 

Liverpool's ministry was a long and eventful one. The War of 1812 with the United States and the final campaigns of the Napoleonic Wars were fought during Liverpool's premiership. It was during his ministry that the Peninsular Campaigns were fought by the Duke of Wellington. France was defeated in the Napoleonic Wars, and Liverpool was appointed to the Order of the Garter. At the peace negotiations that followed, Liverpool's main concern was to obtain a European settlement that would ensure the independence of the Netherlands, Spain and Portugal, and confine France inside its pre-war frontiers without damaging its national integrity. To achieve this, he was ready to return all British colonial conquests. Within this broad framework, he gave Castlereagh a discretion at the Congress of Vienna, the next most important event of his ministry. At the congress, he gave prompt approval for Castlereagh's bold initiative in making the defensive alliance with Austria and France in January 1815. In the aftermath of the defeat of Napoleon – who had briefly escaped exile and returned to rule France – at Waterloo in June that year, many years of peace followed.

The Corn Laws

Home trouble 
Inevitably taxes rose to compensate for borrowing and to pay off the national debt, which led to widespread disturbance between 1812 and 1822. Around this time, the group known as Luddites began industrial action, by smashing industrial machines developed for use in the textile industries of the West Riding of Yorkshire, Nottinghamshire, Leicestershire and Derbyshire. Throughout the period 1811–1816, there was a series of incidents of machine-breaking and many of those convicted faced execution.

Agriculture remained a problem because good harvests between 1819 and 1822 had brought down prices and evoked a cry for greater protection. When the powerful agricultural lobby in Parliament demanded protection in the aftermath, Liverpool gave in to political necessity. Under governmental supervision the notorious Corn Laws of 1815 were passed prohibiting the import of foreign wheat until the domestic price reached a minimum accepted level. Liverpool, however, was in principle a free-trader, but had to accept the bill as a temporary measure to ease the transition to peacetime conditions. His chief economic problem during his time as Prime Minister was that of the nation's finances. 

The interest on the national debt, massively swollen by the enormous expenditure of the final war years, together with the war pensions, absorbed the greater part of normal government revenue. The refusal of the House of Commons in 1816 to continue the wartime income tax left ministers with no immediate alternative but to go on with the ruinous system of borrowing to meet necessary annual expenditure. Liverpool eventually facilitated a return to the gold standard in 1819.

Liverpool argued for the abolition of the wider slave trade at the Congress of Vienna, and at home he supported the repeal of the Combination Laws banning workers from combining into trade unions in 1824. In the latter year the newly formed Royal National Institution for the Preservation of Life from Shipwreck, later the RNLI, obtained Liverpool as its first president.

Assassination attempt 

The reports of the secret committees he obtained in 1817 pointed to the existence of an organised network of disaffected political societies, especially in the manufacturing areas. Liverpool told Peel that the disaffection in the country seemed even worse than in 1794. Because of a largely perceived threat to the government, temporary legislation was introduced. He suspended habeas corpus in both Great Britain (1817) and Ireland (1822). Following the Peterloo Massacre in 1819, his government imposed the repressive Six Acts legislation which limited, among other things, free speech and the right to gather for peaceful demonstration.  In 1820, as a result of these measures, Liverpool and other cabinet ministers were targeted for assassination. They escaped harm when the Cato Street conspiracy was foiled.

Catholic emancipation
During the 19th century, and, in particular, during Liverpool's time in office, Catholic emancipation was a source of great conflict. In 1805, in his first important statement of his views on the subject, Liverpool had argued that the special relationship of the monarch with the Church of England, and the refusal of Roman Catholics to take the oath of supremacy, justified their exclusion from political power. Throughout his career, he remained opposed to the idea of Catholic emancipation, though he did see marginal concessions as important to the stability of the nation.

The decision of 1812 to remove the issue from collective cabinet policy, followed in 1813 by the defeat of Grattan's Roman Catholic Relief Bill, brought a period of calm. Liverpool supported marginal concessions such as the admittance of English Roman Catholics to the higher ranks of the armed forces, the magistracy, and the parliamentary franchise; but he remained opposed to their participation in parliament itself. In the 1820s, pressure from the liberal wing of the Commons and the rise of the Catholic Association in Ireland revived the controversy.

By the date of Sir Francis Burdett's Catholic Relief Bill in 1825, emancipation looked a likely success. Indeed, the success of the bill in the Commons in April, followed by Robert Peel's tender of resignation, finally persuaded Liverpool that he should retire. When Canning made a formal proposal that the cabinet should back the bill, Liverpool was convinced that his administration had come to its end. George Canning then succeeded him as Prime Minister. Catholic emancipation however was not fully implemented until the major changes of the Catholic Relief Act of 1829 under the leadership of the Duke of Wellington and Sir Robert Peel, and with the work of the Catholic Association established in 1823.

Retirement and death

Liverpool's first wife, Louisa, died at 54. He soon married again, on 24 September 1822, to Lady Mary Chester, a long-time friend of Louisa.  Liverpool finally retired on 9 April 1827 after suffering a severe cerebral hemorrhage at his Fife House residence in Whitehall two months earlier, and asked the King to seek a successor. He suffered another minor stroke in July, after which he lingered on at Coombe until a third attack on 4 December 1828 from which he died. Having died childless, he was succeeded as Earl of Liverpool by his younger half-brother Charles. He was buried in Hawkesbury parish church, Gloucestershire, beside his father and his first wife. His personal estate was registered at under £120,000.

Legacy 
Historian R. W. Seton-Watson sums up Liverpool's strengths and weaknesses:

Liverpool was the first British Prime Minister to regularly wear long trousers instead of knee breeches. He entered office at the age of 42 years and one day, making him younger than all of his successors. Liverpool served as Prime Minister for a total of 14 years and 305 days, making him the longest-serving Prime Minister of the 19th century. As of 2022, none of Liverpool's successors has served longer.

In London, Liverpool Street and Liverpool Road, Islington, are named after Lord Liverpool. The Canadian town of Hawkesbury, Ontario, the Hawkesbury River and the Liverpool Plains, New South Wales, Australia, Liverpool, New South Wales, and the Liverpool River in the Northern Territory of Australia were also named after Lord Liverpool.

Lord Liverpool, as Prime Minister to whose government Nathan Mayer Rothschild was a lender, was portrayed by American actor Gilbert Emery in the 1934 movie, The House of Rothschild.

Lord Liverpool's ministry (1812–1827)
 Lord Liverpool – First Lord of the Treasury and Leader of the House of Lords
 Lord Eldon – Lord Chancellor
 Lord Harrowby – Lord President of the Council
 Lord Westmorland – Lord Privy Seal
 Lord Sidmouth – Secretary of State for the Home Department
 Lord Castlereagh (Lord Londonderry after 1821) – Secretary of State for Foreign Affairs and Leader of the House of Commons
 Lord Bathurst – Secretary of State for War and the Colonies
 Lord Melville – First Lord of the Admiralty
 Nicholas Vansittart – Chancellor of the Exchequer
 Lord Mulgrave – Master-General of the Ordnance
 Lord Buckinghamshire – President of the Board of Control
 Charles Bathurst – Chancellor of the Duchy of Lancaster
 Lord Camden – minister without portfolio

Changes

 Late 1812 – Lord Camden leaves the Cabinet
 September 1814 – William Wellesley-Pole (Lord Maryborough from 1821), the Master of the Mint, enters the Cabinet
 February 1816 – George Canning succeeds Lord Buckinghamshire at the Board of Control
 January 1818 – F. J. Robinson, the President of the Board of Trade, enters the Cabinet
 January 1819 – The Duke of Wellington succeeds Lord Mulgrave as Master-General of the Ordnance. Lord Mulgrave becomes minister without portfolio
 1820 – Lord Mulgrave leaves the cabinet
 January 1821 – Charles Bathurst succeeds Canning as President of the Board of Control, remaining also at the Duchy of Lancaster
 January 1822 – Robert Peel succeeds Lord Sidmouth as Home Secretary
 February 1822 – Charles Williams-Wynn succeeds Charles Bathurst at the Board of Control. Bathurst remains at the Duchy of Lancaster and in the Cabinet
 September 1822 – Following the suicide of Lord Londonderry, George Canning becomes Foreign Secretary and Leader of the House of Commons
 January 1823 – Vansittart, elevated to the peerage as Lord Bexley, succeeds Charles Bathurst as Chancellor of the Duchy of Lancaster. F. J. Robinson succeeds Vansittart as Chancellor of the Exchequer. He is succeeded at the Board of Trade by William Huskisson
 1823 – Lord Maryborough, the Master of the Mint, leaves the Cabinet. His successor in the office is not a Cabinet member

Arms

References

Further reading
 
  This contains an assessment of his character and achievements.
 Cookson, J. E. Lord Liverpool's administration: the crucial years, 1815–1822 (1975)
 Gash, Norman. Lord Liverpool: The Life and Political Career of Robert Banks Jenkinson, Second Earl of Liverpool 1770–1828 (1984)
 Gash, Norman. "Jenkinson, Robert Banks, second earl of Liverpool (1770–1828)", Oxford Dictionary of National Biography (Oxford University Press, 2004); online ed.  2008 accessed 20 June 2014 doi:10.1093/ref:odnb/14740
 Gash, Norman. "Lord Liverpool: a private view," History Today (1980) 30#5 pp 35–40
 Hay, William Anthony. Lord Liverpool: A Political Life (The Boydell Press, 2018).
 Hilton, Boyd.  A Mad, Bad, and Dangerous People? England 1783–1846 (New Oxford History of England) (2006) scholarly survey
 Hilton, Boyd. "The Political Arts of Lord Liverpool." Transactions of the Royal Historical Society (Fifth Series) 38 (1988): 147–170. online
 Hutchinson, Martin. Britain's Greatest Prime Minister: Lord Liverpool (Cambridge, The Lutterworth Press, 2020).
 Petrie, Charles. Lord Liverpool and His Times (1954)
 Plowright, John. Regency England: The Age of Lord Liverpool (Routledge, 1996) "The Lancaster Pamphlets".
 Sack, James J.  The Grenvillites, 1801–29: Party Politics and Factionalism in the Age of Pitt and Liverpool (1991)
 Seton-Watson, R. W. Britain in Europe (1789–1914): A Survey of Foreign Policy (1937)  online free

External links

 
 Earl of Liverpool Prime Minister's Office
 "Earl of Liverpool" by Prime Minister's Office
 
 

1770 births
1828 deaths
19th-century prime ministers of the United Kingdom
19th-century heads of government
Alumni of Christ Church, Oxford
British MPs 1790–1796
British MPs 1796–1800
British Secretaries of State for Foreign Affairs
2nd Earl of Liverpool
Fellows of the Royal Society
Knights of the Garter
Lords Warden of the Cinque Ports
Masters of the Mint
Jenkinson, Robert Banks
Members of the Privy Council of Great Britain
Jenkinson, Robert Banks
People educated at Charterhouse School
People from Westminster
Prime Ministers of the United Kingdom
Secretaries of State for the Home Department
Secretaries of State for War and the Colonies
Jenkinson, Robert Banks
Jenkinson, Robert Banks
Jenkinson, Robert Banks
Liverpool, E2
Commissioners of the Treasury for Ireland
Tory prime ministers of the United Kingdom
Leaders of the House of Lords
British politicians of Indian descent